Korobeynikovo is a rural locality (a village) in Yudinskoye Rural Settlement, Velikoustyugsky District, Vologda Oblast, Russia. The population was 265 as of 2002. There are 5 streets.

Geography 
Korobeynikovo is located 6 km northeast of Veliky Ustyug (the district's administrative centre) by road. Sotnikovo is the nearest rural locality.

References 

Rural localities in Velikoustyugsky District